Kill the Kilians is the debut album by German indie rock band Kilians, first released in September 2007.

Track listing

"Short Life of Margott " – 3:04
"Fight the Start " – 3:01
"Enforce Yourself " – 3:07
"Little Billie, Little Brother " – 3:48
"Can't Get Along " – 4:25
"When Will I Ever Get Home" – 3:36
"Sunday " – 3:00
"Fool to Fool " – 3:28
"Jealous Lover " – 2:36
"Something to Arrive " – 2:47
"Inside Outside  " – 3:44
"Dizzy " – 3:24
"P.L.E.A.S.U.R.E.  " – 3:02

See also
2007 in music

External links
Official website
 Kilians at Last.fm

2007 albums